Lazarus Colloredo and Joannes Baptista Colloredo (1617 – after 1646) were Italian conjoined twins who toured freak shows in 17th-century Europe. They were born in Genoa, Italy.

Physical condition

The upper body and left leg of Joannes Baptista (named after John the Baptist) stuck out of his mobile brother, Lazarus. He did not speak, kept his eyes closed and mouth open all the time, and was a parasitic twin. According to a later account by Copenhagen anatomist Thomas Bartholinus, if someone pushed the breast of Joannes Baptista, he moved his hands, ears, and lips.

Entertainment career

To make a living, Lazarus toured around Europe and visited at least Basel, Switzerland, and Copenhagen, Denmark, before he arrived in Scotland in 1642 and later visited the court of Charles I of England.

He also visited Danzig (Gdańsk), the Ottoman Empire, and toured Germany and Italy in 1646.

Private life

Contemporary accounts described Lazarus as courteous and handsome, but for his brother who just dangled before him. When Lazarus was not exhibiting himself, he covered his brother with his cloak to avoid unnecessary attention.

Later accounts claim that Lazarus married and sired several children, none with his condition. His engraved portrait depicts him in a costume of a courtier of the period of the House of Stuart.

Sentenced to death

As reported by Henri Sauval, Lazarus was sentenced to death for killing a man, but averted the execution by pointing out that this would also kill his innocent twin brother.

Disappearance from record

The brothers' exact date of death is unknown. They are last mentioned c. 1646.

References

Further reading
Gould, George M. & Pyle, and Walter L. (1896) Anomalies and Curiosities of Medicine. Retrieved July 5, 2007.
"Lazarus and Johannes Baptista Colloredo." (n.d.). Phreeque.com. Retrieved July 5, 2007.
 Baratta Luca (2016), «A Marvellous and Strange Event». Racconti di nascite mostruose nell’Inghilterra della prima età moderna, Firenze, Firenze University Press, pp. 182-201 [].
 Baratta Luca (2017), The Age of Monsters. Nascite prodigiose nell’Inghilterra della prima età moderna: storia, testi, immagini (1550-1715), prefazione di Maurizio Ascari, Roma, Aracne, 2017, pp. 351-386 [].
 Baratta Luca (2018), ‘Due idee del mostruoso, due idee di nazione. I gemelli Colloredo a Londra (1637) in due ballate di Robert Milbourne e Martin Parker’, Rivista di Letterature Moderne e Comparate, 70(2), pp. 109-131 [ISSN 0391-2108].

1617 births
1640s deaths
17th-century Genoese people
17th-century Italian criminals
People with parasitic twins
People from Genoa
Italian twins
Sibling duos
Sideshow performers
Italian prisoners sentenced to death
Italian people convicted of murder